Master Top Airlines (Master Top Linhas Aéreas Ltda.) was a Brazilian cargo airline. It operated scheduled cargo services between São Paulo and Manaus and beyond Manaus to Bogotá and Miami. It also operated charters. Master Top is based at São Paulo-Guarulhos International Airport and started operations in 2006.

Fleet
The Master Top fleet (as of December 2010) was:

3 Douglas DC-10-30F

See also
List of defunct airlines of Brazil

Notes

External links
 https://web.archive.org/web/20090412031545/http://www.mt-airlines.com/ Company website 

Defunct airlines of Brazil
Airlines established in 2006
Airlines disestablished in 2011
Defunct cargo airlines
2006 establishments in Brazil
2011 disestablishments in Brazil